Anibal Gamboa Gonzalez (1948 – 17 August 2020) was a Venezuelan chess International Master (IM) (2015), Venezuelan Chess Championship winner (1970).

Biography
In the 1970s and the 1980s, Anibal Gamboa was one of Venezuela's leading chess players. He won Venezuelan Chess Championship in 1970.

Anibal Gamboa played for Venezuela in the Chess Olympiads:
 In 1974, at second board in the 21st Chess Olympiad in Nice (+6, =3, -10),
 In 1978, at fourth board in the 23rd Chess Olympiad in Buenos Aires (+2, =2, -5),
 In 1982, at second reserve board in the 25th Chess Olympiad in Lucerne (+0, =1, -0),
 In 1988, at first reserve board in the 28th Chess Olympiad in Thessaloniki (+0, =0, -5).

In recent years, he has participated in chess veteran tournaments, including the World Senior Chess Championships.

References

External links

Anibal Gamboa chess games at 365chess.com

1948 births
2020 deaths
Venezuelan chess players
Chess Olympiad competitors
Chess International Masters
20th-century chess players
20th-century Venezuelan people